Bobby Parker (16 February 1925 – 1 March 1997) was a Scottish footballer. Parker played for Partick Thistle and most notably for Hearts.

Heart of Midlothian
Parker was signed at the age of 22 by Hearts manager Davie McLean on 5 April 1947. He debuted the season after on 16 August 1947 in a 3-2 Scottish League Cup section game 3–2 defeat away to Airdrieonians.

His last first team appearance was that season on 23 November 1957 in a 2–1 defeat away to Clyde.

After retiring as a player he joined the Hearts back room team coaching the reserves. He then joined the Heart's board of directors in which he also had a spell as chairman.

Parker died on 1 March 1997, two weeks after his 72nd birthday.

References

External links 

1925 births
1997 deaths
Footballers from Edinburgh
Association football fullbacks
Scottish footballers
Partick Thistle F.C. players
Heart of Midlothian F.C. players
Bathgate Thistle F.C. players
Scottish Football League players
Heart of Midlothian F.C. non-playing staff
Scotland B international footballers